Live in Hollywood is the second live concert release by Latin pop group RBD. Released on April 4, 2006 in Mexico and in the United States, the DVD includes the whole concert performed and recorded on January 21, 2006 at the Pantages Theater in Los Angeles, California, plus a backstage pass and extra footage of the band on the road on their 'Tour Generación 2006' or 'Nuestro Amor Tour'. This concert was the first the group performed in the United States, with the show itself having a visually colorful and acoustic style, even counting with the support of a gospel choir. 

Despite having been recorded in the United States, the edition of the DVD released in the US does not feature the medley performance of "Rebelde", "Solo Quédate En Silencio" and "Sálvame".  The performance was, however, shown on the US television network Telemundo on March 24, 2007.

In Brazil, the DVD was released on June 14, 2006 and found itself at #1 for two weeks in the country's top music DVD sales chart and sold over 100,000 copies there.

Track listing
"Intro"
"Tras De Mí"
"Me Voy"
"Nuestro Amor"
"Así Soy Yo"
"Qué Fue Del Amor"
"A Tu Lado"
"No Pares"
"Fuera"
"Solo Para Ti"
"Este Corazón"
"Aún Hay Algo"
"Qué Hay Detrás"
"Medley" ("Rebelde"/"Solo Quédate En Silencio"/"Sálvame") (Only available on the Mexican and Brazilian editions of the DVD)
"Feliz Cumpleaños"

Bonus material

RBD in Hollywood
Road to the Pantages
The Creator Pedro Damián
Poncho Interview
Christian Interview
Christopher Interview
Maite Interview
Anahí Interview
Dulce Interview
Pantages Theater Backstage
Pantages Theater Showtime
Pantages Soundcheck
Break Time
Photo Gallery

Personnel
Credits adapted from the DVD's liner notes.

Performance credits

RBD – main vocals
Carlton Anderson – choir
Maxine Waters – choir
Orren Waters – choir
Tiffiney Smith – choir
Leyla Hoyle – choir
Nikki Grier – choir

Musicians

Güido Laris – bass
Mauricio Soto – drums
Oshi Yaganagui – guitar
Charly Rey – guitar
Eduardo Téllez – keyboards
Rafael Padilla – percussion

Production

Camilo Lara –  A&R, executive producer
Melissa Mochulske –  A&R coordination
Güido Laris –  arrangements, musical director
Charly Rey – arrangements
Eduardo Téllez – arrangements
Mauricio Soto – arrangements
Iván Machorro – arrangements
Alexis Covacevich – art director
Antonio Acevedo – associate DP
Benny Corral –  associate producer
Luis Luisillo Miguel –  associate producer, photographer (for COPRODUCE Studio)
Marco Flavio Cruz – cinematographer
Lynda Thomas – choir conductor
Jaime Gutiérrez Cáceres –  coordinator
Sebastián Garza – editing
Pedro Damián –  executive producer
Carlos Lara – director, producer
Carolina Palomo Ramos –  marketing, PR, production coordinator
Raúl González Biestro –  mixer, production
Raúl Oropeza –  mixing engineer
Hula Hula –  graphic design
Marisol Alcelay – product manager
Peter Kent – string quartet conductor

Charts and certifications

Weekly and monthly charts

Year-end charts

Certifications and sales

Release history

See also
Live In Hollywood (album)

Notes

RBD video albums
Live video albums
2006 video albums
2006 live albums